Kravica is a village located in the municipality of Bratunac, Republika Srpska, Bosnia and Herzegovina. As of 2013 census, it has a population of 567 inhabitants.

During the 1992–95 Bosnian War, the village was badly damaged in the 1993 attack, and in 1995 was the place of major killings during the Srebrenica massacre.

History
In 1971 there was a shootout between men from Kravica and men from Konjević Polje.

In 1991, it was reported that neighbouring Serb-inhabited Kravica and Bosniak-inhabited Glogova "had bad blood".

Bosnian War
The village was attacked on 7 January (Serb Orthodox Christmas) 1993 by ARBiH forces under Naser Orić from the besieged Srebrenica enclave under the control of the ARBiH. 46 people died in the attack on the Serb side: 35 VRS soldiers and 11 civilians, and most of the houses were damaged. Men from Kravica participated in the Srebrenica genocide committed against Bosniak civilians and prisoners of war.

Demographics
In 1991, it had a population of 357, of whom 353 were declared as Serbs, with no declared Bosniaks, Croats or Yugoslavs. As of 2013 census, it has a population of 567 inhabitants, all Serbs.

References

Cities and towns in Republika Srpska
Populated places in Bratunac